The 2021 Contender Boats 250 was a NASCAR Xfinity Series race held on February 27, 2021. It was contested over 172 laps—extended from 167 laps due to an overtime finish—on the  oval. It was the third race of the 2021 NASCAR Xfinity Series season. Richard Childress Racing driver Myatt Snider, grabbed his first career Xfinity Series win.

Report

Background 
Homestead-Miami Speedway is a motor racing track located in Homestead, Florida. The track, which has several configurations, has promoted several series of racing, including NASCAR, the NTT IndyCar Series and the Grand-Am Rolex Sports Car Series

From 2002 to 2019, Homestead-Miami Speedway has hosted the final race of the season in all three of NASCAR's series: the NASCAR Cup Series, Xfinity Series and Camping World Truck Series.

Entry list 

 (R) denotes rookie driver.
 (i) denotes driver who is ineligible for series driver points.

Qualifying
Austin Cindric was awarded the pole for the race as determined by competition-based formula. Jordan Anderson and Ronnie Bassett Jr. did not have enough points to qualify for the race.

Starting Lineups

Race

Race results

Stage Results 
Stage One
Laps: 40

Stage Two
Laps: 80

Final Stage Results 

Laps: 167

Race statistics 

 Lead changes: 20 among 11 different drivers
 Cautions/Laps: 8 for 42
 Time of race: 2 hours, 30 minutes, and 59 seconds
 Average speed:

References 

NASCAR races at Homestead-Miami Speedway
2021 in sports in Florida
Contender Boats 250
2021 NASCAR Xfinity Series